Hyaluronidase-3 is an enzyme that in humans is encoded by the HYAL3 gene.

This gene encodes a protein which is similar in structure to hyaluronidases. Hyaluronidases intracellularly degrade hyaluronan, one of the major glycosaminoglycans of the extracellular matrix. Hyaluronan is thought to be involved in cell proliferation, migration and differentiation. However, this protein has not yet been shown to have hyaluronidase activity. The gene is one of several related genes in a region of chromosome 3p21.3 associated with tumor suppression.

References

Further reading